Sporting Arizona FC is an American soccer team based in Arizona. Founded in 1989, Sporting Arizona FC is Arizona's professional development club.

The foundation of Sporting's development model is to bring international talent to play in Arizona, and to showcase our deserving local players internationally.

History

The club originally started in 1989 as the Phoenix Hearts in the original indoor SISL league. They made an immediate impact on the league when they went to the 1989–1990 SISL indoor championship before falling to the Addison Arrows. Hearts coach Peter Baralić was named Coach of the Year.

They changed their name to the Arizona Cotton in 1992 and played both indoor and outdoor for one more year in the USISL, before joining the amateur USISL Premier League in 1995. In 1992, they again went to the final of the USISL Indoor season, losing to the Atlanta Magic. The Arizona coach, Zelimar Antonievic, was named Coach of the Year.

In 1996, the team became the Arizona Phoenix. In 1997, they changed their name again, this time to Arizona Sahuaros, and moved up to the USISL D-3 Pro League. In 1998, the Sahuaros front office named 3 player coaches to take over the Sahuaros Professional franchise, Mate Kozul (Head Coach), Edson Rico and Roger Salazar (Assistant coaches). With their connections in the Valley they assembled a strong team of former HS Gatorade Players of the Year, College All Americans and National JUCO Champions from Yavapai College. That year the Sahuaros were crowned the Western Division Champions and coach Matt Kozul was named USISL Coach of the Year.

After the 2002 season, the Sahuaros left the USL D-3 Pro League and helped form the new Men's Premier Soccer League, finishing the season as champions in the first year. The Sahuaros competed in the NPSL until 2004, after which the club chose to play in USASA affiliated leagues. They re-joined the NPSL in 2008. In 2003–2009, the Sahuaros hired Petar Draksin as their head coach, he made a significant contribution to the Sahuaros franchise by bringing in many talented players and winning many significant games in the different leagues.

In 2016, the Sahuaros were renamed Sporting AZ FC. They joined the UPSL on January 8, 2017, and were placed in the Arizona Conference along with the Arizona Scorpions FC, El Salto United FC & Super Inter AZ. Sporting AZ FC won the Arizona Conference in their 1st season in the UPSL, moving on to the UPSL National Quarterfinals. The team was led by head coach Tim Marchisotto and standout goalkeeper Jake Rybicki. 2018 saw the team raise the bar again, with Marchisotto moving into the general manager role and the addition of Aidan Davison as head coach. The duo achieved success with the team. Sporting AZ won the new Southwest Conference of the UPSL and went to the UPSL Championship game.

In January 2020, "Sporting AZ FC" was renamed Sporting Arizona FC and with the new name came a new ownership. The club continues the same original traditions as a development pathway for players and coaches to reach the professional ranks. Beginning 2022, the Club fields two teams in the United Premier Soccer League (UPSL) - Sporting Arizona FC coached by Eric Junis Aguilar and SAFC Sahuaros coached by Samuel Mendoza.

Players

Current roster
As of May 4, 2019

Notable former players
  Roger Espinoza (2013 – Premier League – Wigan Athletic) (2008 SuperDraft – MLS 11th pick in the 1st round – Kansas City Wizards) 
  Allen Chapman (Professional referee working in MLS since 2012)
  Nick DeLeon (2012 Super Draft – MLS 7th pick in the 1st round – DC United)
  Justin Meram
  Scott Maxwell (1991/92 Indoor Season – acquired from SISL's Amarillo Challengers)
  Randy Soderman

Year-by-year

Outdoor team

Indoor team

Honors
 MPSL Champions 2003
 USL D-3 Pro League West Division Champions 1998
 SISL Cactus Division Champions 1989/90 (Indoor)
 UPSL Arizona Conference Champions 2017 (Spring Season)
 UPSL Southwest Conference Champions 2018 (Spring Season)

Hall of Fame
  Mate Kozul Induction year 2009
  Edson Rico Induction year 2009
  Roger Salazar Induction year 2009
  Harold Calvo Induction year 2018

Head coaches/Assistant coaches
  Peter Baralić (1989–1991)
  Cole Antonijevic (1992)
  Zelimar Antonijevic (1993–1995)
  Dave Murray (1996)
  Walter Brusic (1996–1998)
  Mate Kozul (1998–1999)
  Asst. Edson Rico (1998–1999)
  Asst. Roger Salazar (1998–1999)
  Manny Arias (1999–2001)
  Asst. Tim Marchisotto (2000-2003)
  Petar Draksin (2002–2009)
  Orhan Kraja (2010–2011)
  Tim Marchisotto (2012–2017)
  Aidan Davison (2017–2018)
  Tom Hurdle (2019–2020)
  Eric Junis Aguilar - Sporting Arizona (2020-current)
  Tim Schicky - SAFC Sahuaros (2021–2022)
  Samuel Mendoza - SAFC Sahuaros (2022- current)

References

External links
 www.sportingarizona.com
 www.twitter.com/sportingarizona
 www.facebook.com/pg/sportingaz/posts/
 www.instagram.com/sporting_arizona/

S
National Premier Soccer League teams
Soccer clubs in Arizona
USL Second Division teams
Association football clubs established in 1989
1989 establishments in Arizona